Tolyltriazole is a mixture of isomers or congeners that differ from benzotriazole by the addition of one methyl group attached somewhere on the benzene ring. "The term tolyltriazole (CAS 29385-43-1) generally [refers to] the commercial mixture composed of approximately equal amounts of 4- and 5-methylbenzotriazole, with small quantities of [their respective 7- and 6-methyl tautomers]".

Structure

Synthesis and reactions
Synthesis is much like that of benzotriazole, but starting with methyl-o-phenylenediamine instead of o-phenylenediamine. Isomers of methyl-o-phenylenediamine include 3-methyl-o-phenylenediamine, 4-methyl-o-phenylenediamine, and N-methyl-o-phenylenediamine (not involved here).

Applications
Tolyltriazole has uses similar to benzotriazole, but has better solubility in some organic solvents.

Corrosion inhibitor

Environmental relevance

Related compounds

References

Benzotriazoles
Chelating agents
Conservation and restoration materials
Corrosion inhibitors